This is a list of the Austrian Singles Chart number-one hits of 1996.

See also
1996 in music

References

1996 in Austria
1996 record charts
Lists of number-one songs in Austria